Ebrahim Khan Afshar was a military commander and statesman during the eighteenth century in Afsharid Persia. He was the younger brother of the Shah of Iran, Nader Shah, and was appointed to high office after Nader came to prominence due to his military campaigns which restored the Safavid dynasty to power again.

Although he commanded men under the authority of his brother throughout the early Naderian wars he never held any independent commands until being given autonomous command over the Persian army in the Caucasus. At the same time that Nader Shah launched his invasion of the Hotaki homeland, meant for a spring-board for the invasion of Mughal India, Ebrahim Kham took the field against the Lezgis in Daghestan.

The campaign in Daghestan began well for Ebrahim; he was able to force a pitched battle with the Lezgis in which he won defeated them overwhelmingly. However he was later ambushed in a valley by a small band of Lezgis who fell upon his meagre company of riders and slew him. His body was initially treated with respect and buried, but it body was later dug up, burnt and hung from a tree.

See also
Nader Shah
Afsharid dynasty
Persian Invasion of Daghestan

History of Dagestan
Year of birth unknown
Place of birth unknown
18th-century Iranian politicians
Year of death unknown
Afsharid generals
18th-century Iranian military personnel